Hervi in Iran may refer to:
 Hervi, East Azerbaijan
 Hervi, Kermanshah